USCGC Hamilton may refer to:

 , is a U.S. Coast Guard cutter in service from 1967 to 2011
 , is a U.S. Coast Guard cutter commissioned in 2014.

See also

United States Coast Guard ship names